José Manuel López Gaspar (born 12 July 1987) is a Spanish footballer who plays for Mérida AD as a winger.

He played 15 Segunda División matches for Huesca but spent most of his career in Segunda División B, where he represented nine teams and made over 250 appearances.

Club career
Born in Cáceres, Extremadura, Gaspar made his senior debuts with CP Cacereño in 2005, in Tercera División. In the 2007 summer he moved to Albacete Balompié, being assigned to the reserves also in the fourth level.

On 10 October 2007 Gaspar played his first match as a professional, coming on as a substitute in a 0–2 home loss against Xerez CD, for the season's Copa del Rey. It was his maiden appearance with the first team, however.

In 2008 Gaspar moved to Mérida UD in Segunda División B. He continued to compete in the category in the following years, representing UD Logroñés, CD Badajoz, Cacereño and SD Huesca; with the latter he achieved promotion to Segunda División in the end of the 2014–15 campaign, appearing in 37 matches and scoring a career-best 13 goals.

Gaspar made his debut in the second tier on 22 August 2015, starting in a 2–3 home loss against Deportivo Alavés. On 19 August of the following year, he rescinded his contract, signing for third-tier Hércules CF three days later.

In January 2018, Gaspar signed for FC Cartagena after his release from Hércules. He scored the only goal of their playoff semi-final win over RC Celta de Vigo B in June, though the team lost the final by the same margin to Extremadura UD. 

Gaspar joined UE Cornellà in August 2018. After helping them to the playoff quarterfinals in his one season in Catalonia, he returned to the city of Mérida to sign for Mérida AD.

References

External links

1988 births
Living people
People from Cáceres, Spain
Sportspeople from the Province of Cáceres
Spanish footballers
Footballers from Extremadura
Association football wingers
Segunda División players
Segunda División B players
Tercera División players
CP Cacereño players
Atlético Albacete players
Mérida UD footballers
UD Logroñés players
CD Badajoz players
SD Huesca footballers
Hércules CF players
FC Cartagena footballers
UE Cornellà players
Mérida AD players